Hank Klibanoff (born March 26, 1949 in Florence, Alabama) is an American journalist, now a professor at Emory University.  He and Gene Roberts won the 2007 Pulitzer Prize for History for the book The Race Beat: The Press, the Civil Rights Struggle, and the Awakening of a Nation.

Early life and education
Hank Klibanoff was born and raised in Florence, Alabama. He got an early start in journalism delivering newspapers by bicycle. He graduated from Coffee High School in Florence and attended Washington University in St. Louis, where he studied under Howard Nemerov and received his B.A. in English. He subsequently received a master's degree in journalism from the Medill School of Northwestern University.

Career
He was managing editor of the Atlanta Journal-Constitution until June 24, 2008, when he stepped down. He had been deputy managing editor for The Philadelphia Inquirer, where he worked for 20 years. He had also been a reporter for six years in Mississippi and three years at The Boston Globe.

Klibanoff is currently the director of the journalism program at Emory University in Atlanta, Georgia, as well as the project managing editor of the Civil Rights Cold Case Project.

He hosts a podcast called "Buried Truths" about racial tensions in Georgia during and after the 1948 election. The podcast won a 2018 Peabody Award.

Family
Klibanoff is father to 3 girls, Eleanor, Caroline and Corinne; he is married to Laurie Leonard.

References

External links
 

1949 births
People from Florence, Alabama
Living people
American male journalists
Journalism teachers
Pulitzer Prize for History winners
Medill School of Journalism alumni
Washington University in St. Louis alumni
Journalists from Alabama
American podcasters
20th-century American journalists
21st-century American journalists
21st-century American non-fiction writers
American male non-fiction writers
21st-century American male writers
Emory University faculty